Shanahan is a surname of Irish origin and might refer to:

 Brendan Shanahan (born 1969), a former Canadian ice hockey player and current president of the Toronto Maple Leafs
 Brendan Shanahan (author) (born 1979), Australian author of In Turkey I Am Beautiful and The Secret Life of the Gold Coast
 Carol Shanahan (born 1957), English businesswoman and club chairperson of Port Vale Football Club
 Holly Shanahan (born 1981), New Zealand actress best known for her role in Power Rangers Jungle Fury
 Jack Shanahan (born 1999), drift driver, champion of British Drift Championship in 2016 and 2017
 Jennie Shanahan (1897–1936), a member of the Irish Citizen Army who fought in the Easter Rising and the Irish War of Independence.
 Jeremiah F. Shanahan (1834–1886), Roman Catholic Bishop of Harrisburg, Pennsylvania from 1868 until his death; elder brother of John
 Jesse Shanahan, American disability activist and astrophysicist
 John W. Shanahan (1846–1916), Roman Catholic Bishop of Harrisburg, Pennsylvania from 1899 until his death; younger brother of Jeremiah
 Kid Shanahan (Joseph A. Shanahan, active 1873–1883), river pirate and member of the Patsy Conroy Gang
 Kyle Shanahan (born 1979), US American football head coach of the San Francisco 49ers
 Martin Shanahan (born 1973), Irish businessman and public servant, CEO of IDA Ireland
 Melanie Shanahan (1964–2003), Australian folk singer and songwriter
 Mike Shanahan (born 1952), former American football head coach, winner of Super Bowl XXXII and XXXIII with the Denver Broncos
 Murray Shanahan, professor of cognitive robotics at Imperial College London
 Patrick Shanahan (politician) (1908–2000), Irish Fianna Fáil politician
 Patrick Shanahan (Medal of Honor) (1867–1937), United States Navy sailor
 Patrick M. Shanahan (born 1962), American businessman and government official

Surnames of Irish origin
Anglicised Irish-language surnames